Nexhip Trungu Stadium is a multi-use stadium in Cërrik, Elbasan County, Albania which is used as the home ground of local football club Turbina Cërrik.

In 2015, Turbina Cërrik were promoted to the Albanian First Division, the second tier of Albanian football, and Cërrik Municipality made minor improvements to the stadium which included the installation of 350 new seats in the main stand as well as a renovation of the changing rooms.

References

Football venues in Albania
Buildings and structures in Elbasan
Sport in Elbasan